Gerard Saucier is an American psychologist. He is a professor in the department of Psychology at the University of Oregon. He has co-authored many academic articles on personality. He won the 1999 Cattell Early Career Research Award from the Society of Multivariate Experimental Psychology.

References

External links

Living people
Deep Springs College alumni
University of North Carolina at Chapel Hill alumni
John F. Kennedy University alumni
University of Oregon alumni
University of Oregon faculty
21st-century American psychologists
1955 births
20th-century American psychologists